Asarta albarracinella is a species of snout moth in the genus Asarta. It was described by Patrice J.A. Leraut and Gérard Christian Luquet in 1991 and is known from Spain.

References

Moths described in 1991
Phycitini
Moths of Europe